Yoshio Masuda (died 2009) was a former Japanese naval commander, regarded as the father of modern wave power technology. Among other devices, the now used principle of Oscillating Water Column is regarded as his invention. It was initially used for small-scale navigation buoys.

See also
Wave power

References

Japanese military personnel
Wave power
2009 deaths
Year of birth missing